Rodrigo Galo Brito (born 19 September 1986) is a Brazilian professional footballer who plays as a right back.

Club career

Early career
In 2000, Rodrigo Galo joined the academy of club Juventus. He spent four years playing for the club's youth teams. In 2005, he moved to Avaí, and in 2006 signed a professional contract with them for a period of two years. He made 31 appearances for the club, all as a substitute. In the summer 2008, the Rodrigo Galo moved to Portuguese side Gil Vicente. He scored 12 goals in 86 matches for the Barcelos-based club. In the summer 2011, Galo signed for Braga, but  was sent back to Gil Vicente on loan. Further loans at Académica de Coimbra and Greek Super League side Panetolikos followed. In the summer of 2014, he moved to Paços de Ferreira.

AEK Athens
In May 2015 Rodrigo Galo signed a two-year contract with the Greek club AEK. On 22 August 2015 he made his debut and scored his first goal for the club in a 3–0 home win against Platanias. In May 2016, Rodrigo Galo played the full 90 minutes of the Greek Cup Final as AEK beat Οlympiacos 2-1. His contract was renewed for another two years in October 2017. Rodrigo Galo made 27 league appearances in 2017-18, helping AEK to their first Super League title in 24 years, with his only league goal coming in a 3–0 Athenian derby win over Panathinaikos.

At the end of the season, Süper Lig side Ankaragücü attempted to sign Rodrigo Galo but the offer was rejected, and shortly after he scored his first ever goal in a UEFA competition in a 2–1 home win game against Celtic for UEFA Champions League Third qualifying round, 2nd leg.

Later career 
At the end of the 2018-19 season Rodrigo Galo moved to another Greek club, Atromitos. After making 52 league appearances in two league seasons he transferred to Portuguese club Casa Pia in 2021.

Career statistics

Club

Honours
 AEK Athens
Super League Greece: 2017–18
Greek Cup: 2015–16

Individual
Super League Greece Team of the Year: 2013–14, 2015–16

References

External links

Mãe de Rodrigo Galo diz que lateral não quer renovar com Avaí 
Lateral-direito Rodrigo Galo troca Avaí pelo futebol europeu 
Por onde anda Rodrigo Galo 
Zé Luís e Rodrigo Galo reforços 
Rodrigo Galo at playmakerstats.com (English version of ogol.com.br)

1986 births
Living people
Brazilian footballers
Brazilian expatriate footballers
Association football defenders
Primeira Liga players
Super League Greece players
Avaí FC players
Gil Vicente F.C. players
S.C. Braga players
Panetolikos F.C. players
F.C. Paços de Ferreira players
AEK Athens F.C. players
Atromitos F.C. players
Brazilian expatriate sportspeople in Portugal
Expatriate footballers in Portugal
Expatriate footballers in Greece
People from Rio Branco, Acre
Sportspeople from Acre (state)